Amethi district is the 72nd district of the state of Uttar Pradesh in northern India. This district is a part of Ayodhya division in the Awadh region of the Uttar Pradesh. It covers an area of 2329.11 km². Gauriganj is the administrative headquarters of the district.

It is better known due to being the seat of power of the Indian Nehru-Gandhi political dynasty since 1980. The former prime minister Jawaharlal Nehru, his grandsons Sanjay and Rajiv Gandhi (the sons of Indira Gandhi), Rajiv Gandhi's widow Sonia Gandhi and son Rahul Gandhi, have at one time or the other, represented its constituency. However, this changed in 2019 when Rahul Gandhi was defeated in the Lok Sabha elections by Smriti Irani, a former TV actress.

Overview
Amethi was the 72nd district of Uttar Pradesh which came into existence on 1 July 2010 by merging three tehsils of the erstwhile Sultanpur district namely Amethi, Gauriganj and Musafirkhana and two tehsils of the erstwhile Raebareli district, namely, Salon and Tiloi. In 2013, however, it was proposed that the Salon sub-district be moved from Amethi district back to Rae Bareli district in Lucknow division. This was done by 2019.

Amethi is a major town of district and also a municipal board.

History
Amethi lies on the Raebareli-Amethi-Sultanpur road about 40 km south-west of Sultanpur city.  Also called as Raipur-Amethi, of which Raipur belonged to the Raja of Amethi who lived at Ram Nagar.  His ancestors used to live in Raipur-Phulwari where the old fort is still found. Here is also a temple called Hanumangarhi and a mosque both built about hundred years ago. About three kilometres north of Ram Nagar there is a tomb of the famous poet Malik Muhammad Jayasi (best remembered for his epic composition Padmavat) where he died, and the fort was built by Bandhalgoti Rajas.

Location

District Amethi lies at the latitude 26°9’ north and longitude 81°49’ east at an average elevation of 101 metres(331 feet) from mean sea level. The total geographic area of the districts is about 3063 km2. The surface is generally level, being broken only by ravines in the neighbourhood of the rivers. The principal river is Gomti, which passes through the centre of the district. North side of this district is bounded by Faizabad District; South side is bounded by Pratapgarh District. West side is bounded by Bara-Banki District and Rai Baeilly District and the East side is bounded by Sultanpur district.

Topography

The land of Amethi district is generally plane except some regions around the Gomti River which drains almost the whole district. It may be called an agrarian area as agriculture is the main occupation of the people. Amethi district has a wet and dry climate with average temperatures ranging between 23 °C to 28 °C. Amethi experiences three distinct seasons: summer, monsoon and a mild autumn. Typical summer months are from March to May, with maximum temperatures ranging from 36° to 44 °C. The rainy season in the districts falls between June and September and July being the wettest month of the year. Winter starts from November. The daytime temperature hovers around 22 °C while night temperature is below 8 °C during December and January, often dropping to 2°to 3 °C.

Change of status and name 
Chief minister Mayawati had ordered formation of Chhatrapati Shahuji Maharaj Nagar district on 21 May 2003 but following a change of guard her arch political rival Mulayam Singh Yadav had scrapped it on 23 November the same year. The Chatrapati Shahuji Maharaj Nagar district included within it five tehsils of Sultanpur and Rae Bareli districts which form part of Amethi constituency. In December 2003, a lawyer of Amethi, Uma Shankar Pandey, had challenged the order scrapping the formation of the district in the High Court.

BSP won the 2007 Uttar Pradesh state legislative assembly election and Chief Minister Mayawati ordered the formation of the district again. The district came into existence on 1 July 2010 by merging three  tehsils of the erstwhile Sultanpur district, namely, Amethi, Gauriganj and Musafirkhana and two tehsils of the erstwhile Raebareli district, namely, Salon and Tiloi and was named as Chhatrapati Shahuji Maharaj Nagar.

However the name of the district was changed to Amethi after Samajwadi Party came into power in the 2012 state legislative assembly election.

In Lucknow on 7 October 2013,the State Cabinet revoked the earlier notification regarding renaming of Amethi as Chhatrapati Shahu Ji Maharaj Nagar. Now the Amethi will be known as its previous name, told Chief Secretary Mr. Akhand Pratap Singh in a media. Amethi contains a hospital (Sanjay Gandhi Hospital) at Munshiganj. The NGO, Society for Animal Health Agriculture Science and Humanity is located at Munshiganj.

Demographics

In the 2011 Indian census used the old district definitions, and so did not list Amethi district. The sub-districts (tehsils) that form Amethi district had the following populations:

Scheduled Castes made up 512,215 (24.98%) of the population.

Languages 

At the time of the 2011 census, 81.32% of the population spoke Hindi, 17.16% Awadhi and 1.28% Urdu as their first language. The main language in the district is Awadhi but most people return their language as 'Hindi' on the census.

Transport
Amethi is connected to the major cities in Uttar Pradesh and North-Eastern India via Indian Railways and roads. It has direct trains connecting with major cities like Delhi, Lucknow, Kanpur, Dehradun, Haridwar, Allahabad, Varanasi, Kolkata, Puri, Bhopal, Mumbai and Bangalore. The closest airport is Allahabad Airport which is 95 kilometers (59 miles) from Amethi.

A number of Uttar Pradesh State Road Transport Corporation buses ply from Amethi.

Education

University and colleges

 Rajiv Gandhi Institute of Petroleum Technology, 
 Indira Gandhi Rashtriya Uran Akademi,
 Government Medical College, Amethi
 Footwear Design and Development Institute
 Rajiv Gandhi National Aviation University
 Babasaheb Bhimrao Ambedkar University, Satellite Campus, Amethi
 IIIT Tikaemafi, Amethi
 Rajarshi Rananjay Singh College Of Pharmacy
 Government Girlas Polytechnic, Amethi
 Sanjay Gandhi Polytechnic
 Rajarshi Rananjay Sinh Institute of Management & Technology (RRSIMT AMETHI), Amethi

Basic education
Amethi district contains 1,431 government primary schools, 433 government upper primary schools, 33 government-aided primary schools, 42 madrasas and 15 intermediate schools, including one government inter-college.

Industries

 Amethi has the Avionics Division of Hindustan Aeronautics Limited, the organization responsible for manufacture of Aircraft for Indian Airforce. One Ordnance Factory has been established in 2009 by Congress Government to manufacture small arms and weapons.
 The district also contains a unit of Indo Gulf Fertilizers.
The district also contains large unit of ACC CEMENT and Rail neer plant in tikaria near village ANNI BAJAL

Divisions
The district comprises 4 tehsils, 13 development blocks, 14 police stations and 401 lekhpal areas. These tehsils are: Gauriganj, Amethi, Musafirkhana and Tiloi. Amethi is the largest city in this district.

The district comprises four Vidhan Sabha constituencies, namely, Gauriganj, Jagdishpur, Amethi and Tiloi. All of these are part of Amethi Lok Sabha constituency. It is surrounded by the constituency districts of Faizabad, Sultanpur and Barabanki.

The district magistrate is Arun Kumar.

Notable people 

Babu Himmat Sah (founder ruler of Kohra)
Babu Bhoop Singh (prominent leader in Indian Rebellion of 1857 against British)
Ravindra Pratap Singh (MP and MLA)
Rahul Gandhi (MP)
Rajiv Gandhi (former Prime Minister of India)
Sanjaya Sinh (MP and cabinet minister)
Ameeta Singh (MLA)
Smriti Irani (MP and cabinet minister)
Garima Singh (MLA)

References

 
Districts of Uttar Pradesh
Faizabad division
States and territories established in 2010